Bojane is a village in the municipality of Saraj, North Macedonia.

Demographics
According to the 2021 census, the village had a total of 2.132 inhabitants. Ethnic groups in the village include:

Albanians  2.071
Macedonians 1
Others 60

References

External links

Villages in Saraj Municipality
Albanian communities in North Macedonia